Jacques Hurtubise may refer to:
Jacques Hurtubise (painter) (1939–2014), Canadian abstract painter
Jacques Hurtubise (cartoonist) or Zyx (1950–2015), French-Canadian cartoonist, founder of Croc magazine, and political candidate
Jacques Hurtubise (mathematician) (born 1957), Canadian mathematician